Powerscourt House may refer to:

 Powerscourt House, Dublin, Ireland, a townhouse and shopping centre
 A house on Powerscourt Estate near Enniskerry, County Wicklow, Ireland

See also 
 Powerscourt (disambiguation)